Scully may refer to:

Scully (surname)
Scully (TV series), British television drama

See also

Leon Sculy Logothetides (1853–1912), Romanian politician and surgeon
Skully (disambiguation)